John G. Nichols (December 29, 1812 – January 22, 1898) was an American businessman, builder, and politician.

Early life 
On December 29, 1812, John Gregg Nichols was born in Canandaigua, New York. His father, William Nicholas, was a Scottish immigrant.

Career 
Nichols served as the Sheriff of Jackson County, Iowa for two terms in the 1840s.

He made the trip to California in 1849, arriving in San Bernardino on December 31, 1849. He served as the third Mayor of Los Angeles from 1852 to 1853 and again from 1856 to 1859.

Personal life 
Nichols married Florida Cox. They lived in the first brick house to be built in Los Angeles, California. Their son was the first American to be born in the city, and he was the first mayor to expand the city.

On January 22, 1898, Nichols died in Los Angeles, California. He was buried at the Angelus-Rosedale Cemetery in Los Angeles, California. Nichols Canyon was named in his honor.

References

Mayors of Los Angeles
1812 births
1898 deaths
Burials at Angelus-Rosedale Cemetery
California Democrats
Politicians from Los Angeles
Politicians from Canandaigua, New York
19th-century American politicians